Gurutzeta Kirol Futbol Taldea is a football team based in Barakaldo in the autonomous community of Basque Country. Founded in 1980, the team plays in División de Honor, holding home games at La Siebe, with a 1,030-seat capacity.

Season to season

References

Football clubs in the Basque Country (autonomous community)
Association football clubs established in 1980
Divisiones Regionales de Fútbol clubs
1980 establishments in the Basque Country (autonomous community)
Barakaldo